Masud Ali Khan Minhas (1911 – 16 January 1936) was an Indian field hockey player who competed in the 1932 Summer Olympics.

In 1932 he was a member of the Indian field hockey team, which won the gold medal. He played one match as halfback.

He was born in Sarikue, India and died of tuberculosis in Calcutta, India sometime in the late 1930s.

References

External links
 
 Olympic profile

1911 births
Field hockey players from Punjab, India
Olympic field hockey players of India
Field hockey players at the 1932 Summer Olympics
Indian male field hockey players
Olympic gold medalists for India
1936 deaths
Olympic medalists in field hockey
Medalists at the 1932 Summer Olympics
20th-century deaths from tuberculosis
Tuberculosis deaths in India